There are eight stadiums in use by Southern League (SL) baseball teams. The oldest stadium is AT&T Field (2000) in Chattanooga, Tennessee, home of the Chattanooga Lookouts. The newest stadium is Toyota Field (2020) in Madison, Alabama, home of the Rocket City Trash Pandas. Four stadiums were built in the 2000s, three in the 2010s, and one in the 2020s. The highest seating capacity is 8,500 at Regions Field in Birmingham, Alabama, where the Birmingham Barons play. The lowest capacity is 5,038 at Admiral Fetterman Field in Pensacola, Florida, where the Pensacola Blue Wahoos play. All stadiums use a grass surface.

Since its founding, there have been 34 stadiums located among 27 municipalities known to have been used by the league. Although a few other leagues had contributed to the history of the SL, it was decided that the league would not maintain records prior to the 1964 season. Therefore, the list does not include stadiums from its predecessor leagues. The oldest stadium to have hosted SL games is Rickwood Field (1910), home of the Birmingham Barons; Toyota Field is also the newest of all stadiums to host SL games. The highest known seating capacity was 17,000 at Herschel Greer Stadium, the Nashville Sounds home. The stadium with the lowest known capacity was Knights Park, home of the Charlotte Hornets and Charlotte O's/Knights, which seated only 3,000.

Active stadiums
{|class="wikitable sortable plainrowheaders"
|-
!Name
!Team
!City
!State
!Opened
!data-sort-type="number"|Capacity
!class="unsortable"|Ref.
|-
!scope="row"|Admiral Fetterman Field
|Pensacola Blue Wahoos
|Pensacola
|Florida
|2012
|align="right"|5,038
|
|-
!scope="row"|AT&T Field
|Chattanooga Lookouts
|Chattanooga
|Tennessee
|2000
|align="right"|6,362
|
|-
!scope="row"|MGM Park
|Biloxi Shuckers
|Biloxi
|Mississippi
|2015
|align="right"|6,076
|
|-
!scope="row"|Montgomery Riverwalk Stadium
|Montgomery Biscuits
|Montgomery
|Alabama
|2004
|align="right"|7,000
|
|-
!scope="row"|Regions Field
|Birmingham Barons
|Birmingham
|Alabama
|2013
|align="right"|8,500
|
|-
!scope="row"|Smokies Stadium
|Tennessee Smokies
|Kodak
|Tennessee
|2000
|align="right"|6,412
|
|-
!scope="row"|Toyota Field
|Rocket City Trash Pandas
|Madison
|Alabama
|2020
|align="right"|7,000
|
|-
!scope="row"|Trustmark Park
|Mississippi Braves
|Pearl
|Mississippi
|2005
|align="right"|8,480
|
|}

Map

Gallery

Former stadiums

Map

See also

List of Double-A baseball stadiums
List of Eastern League stadiums
List of Texas League stadiums
List of Southern League teams

Notes

References

External links

Digitalballparks.com's photographic history of Southern League ballparks since 1921

Southern League
Southern League stadiums